The 2014–15 Basketball League Belgium Division I, known as the 2014–15 Scooore! League for sponsorship reasons, was the 88th season of the Basketball League Belgium. This season started with 11 clubs, including newly formed team Limburg United. Telenet Oostende was the defending champion.

The 2014–15 season marked the first season of the league without the name Ethias League, after Ethias stopped their sponsoring activities.

Format
Because a new team was added in Limburg United, a new competition format was introduced. The regular season now contained two rounds: in the first round all teams would play 2 matches against each other (one at home, one away). After 20 played games the league will be divided in two groups: the first group contains the teams seeded 1–6 and the second group 7–11. The results of the first round are included in the final standings.

The first 8 teams qualified for the Playoffs, the quarterfinals would be played in a best-of-three format and the Semifinals and Finals in a best-of-five.

Licenses
The licences for the 2014–15 season were announced in April 2014.

A-licenses
Telenet BC Oostende
Okapi Aalstar
Port of Antwerp Giants
Proximus Spirou
Belfius Mons-Hainaut
Liège Basket

B-licenses
Stella Artois Leuven Bears
Limburg United
VOO Wolves Verviers-Pepinster

C-licenses
Kangoeroes Basket Willebroek
Basic-Fit Brussels

Teams

Regular season

Standings

Results

First stage

Second stage

Playoffs

Awards

See also
2014–15 Belgian Basketball Cup

References

External links
Official website

Basketball League Belgium Division I seasons
Belgian
Lea